Evelyne-Cynthia Niako (born 25 September 1983) is a Côte d'Ivoire sprinter who specializes in the 100 and 200 metres.

She finished seventh in the 200 metres at the 2006 African Championships, and won a bronze medal in the 4 x 100 metres relay at the 2007 All-Africa Games.

Personal bests
100 metres - 11.34 s (2006)
200 metres - 23.14 s (2006)

External links

1983 births
Living people
Ivorian female sprinters
African Games bronze medalists for Ivory Coast
African Games medalists in athletics (track and field)
Athletes (track and field) at the 2007 All-Africa Games